Laura Siegemund and Mate Pavić were the defending champions, but Siegemund was unable to compete due to injury. Pavić played alongside Andreja Klepač, but lost to Alicja Rosolska and Santiago González in the first round.

Martina Hingis and Jamie Murray won their second consecutive Grand Slam mixed doubles title, defeating Chan Hao-ching and Michael Venus in the final, 6–1, 4–6, [10–8].

Seeds

Draw

Finals

Top half

Bottom half

References

External links
 Mixed Doubles Main draw
2017 US Open – Doubles draws and results at the International Tennis Federation

Mixed Doubles
US Open – Mixed Doubles
US Open – Mixed Doubles
US Open (tennis) by year – Mixed doubles